Luiza Possi Gadelha (born June 26, 1984) is a Brazilian pop singer.  She is the daughter of another famous Brazilian singer, Zizi Possi.

Biography
In 1999, Luiza was invited to go on stage and sing a song with a band that was opening a show by Skank at Credicard Hall in São Paulo. The audience consisted of 12 thousand people, and the singer performed the song "O Vento", Jota Quest, backed only by a piano.

In 2001, Possi went with some bands playing in an informal way, until she participated in the Programa do Jô, beside her mother, Zizi Possi, which aired on Rede Globo, and performed the song "Angel" theme from the movie City of Angels. The next day she received multiple invitations to sign music contracts.

Luiza lived with her father, who was then president of Indie Records, and recorded her first album in 2001 under the production of Rick Bonadio. The album took the name of "I'm So" and produced two hits, "Same Day," which was her biggest hit. It was one of the most played in 2002, and the title track from the album is another great success, being subject of the novel Women Love, which was a huge hit with teenagers, and, at the time, the media said it had Luiza in a rivalry with two other pop singers of the time, Sandy and Leah Wanessa. In the same year she made her first national tour, and received several awards, which included the Award Multishow Brazilian Music Singer of Revelation. She became the co-host of Jovens Tardes on the Globo network in 2003.

In 2004, Possi released her second album, entitled "Pro World Bringing" through Indie Records, under the production of Rick Bonadio. The disc Veude sold 10 thousand copies, less than its predecessor, but it produced a hit, "All That Is Good", also the subject of the novel Lady of Destiny's Globe. Her father had a sudden stroke during the release of "All That Is Good," and, following her father's stroke, she decided to not release her second single from the album, her record closed and she cancelled her tour(because of the father). She was on hiatus for two years without work, during which she studied voice and piano.

In late 2005, Luiza received invitations to record a new album and sign major labels in the country, but the record that she did was an album for a teenage audience as in her previous albums, but it hit the foot is turned down several contracts. Possi and her father opened their own label LGK Music, with distribution by EMI / Som Livre. That same year, she released the CD Listening Luiza, in the production of her father, marked the debut of Luiza MPB style centered on the theme of love and critically acclaimed, and considered her best work by launching the first of many watersheds in career of the singer with this album she left the image of teen pop singer, to be become a mature woman of the MPB. He had three hits, "Gandaia Wave / Stone and Sand," "Listen" and "Your Name", the latter two being the subject of novels Globe, Pé na Jaca and Pages of Life respectively, all three made the radios segimento MPB. In the same year Luiza entered the third tour, Listening Tour, with a hundred concerts a year and had a recording of the first DVD, with eleven new tracks is eight tracks taken from their other albums, was recorded in Rio de Janeiro; to release DVD her label released a CD with fifteen songs, and helped make the DVD to be a sales success, with 15 thousand copies sold in the same year. In 2007, the album Listen, earned her her first nominations to the Latin Grammy Awards, the prize more important than the music in three categories: Best New Artist, Best Album and Best Brazilian Contemporary Pop Album of Brazilian popular music, but lost in all three categories.

After promoting her hit record in 2006, she returned with her fifth album, which was more creative, which was dedicated to new songs from pop and MPB: Good Winds Always arrive, is acclaimed by critics and many fans and critics have said, that did not exceed its last studio album. This album, is her copyright and had six tracks signed by her.

In an interview with MTV Brazil, Luiza announced a DVD of her current tour, Weatherlight, which will be released in the near future.

She participated in the first edition of the reality show, Circus of the program Faustão Domingão Faustão, placing 5th.

Discography

Studio albums

Live albums

Compilation albums

Singles

DVD

Soundtrack

Tours
 2002: Turnê Eu Sou Assim
 2004: Turnê Pro Mundo Levar
 2006: Turnê Escuta
 2007: Turnê A Vida é Mesmo Agora
 2009: Turnê Bons Ventos Sempre Chegam
 2011: Turnê Seguir Cantando
 2014: Turnê Sobre Amor e o Tempo

Videography
 2007 – Circo do Faustão
 2005 – Romeu e Julieta
 2003 – Jovens Tardes

References 

1984 births
Living people
Brazilian pop singers
Brazilian people of Italian descent
21st-century Brazilian singers
21st-century Brazilian women singers